Endicott may refer to:

Places
 Endicott, Kentucky
 Endicott, Nebraska, a village in Jefferson County, Nebraska, USA
 Endicott, New York, a village in Broome County, New York, USA
 Endicott, Virginia, a small community in Franklin County, Virginia, USA
 Endicott, Washington, a town in Whitman County, Washington, USA
 Endicott (MBTA station), Dedham, Massachusetts, USA
 Endicott Island, an artificial island in Alaska, USA

People (surname)
 Endicott (surname)

People (given name)
 Endicott Peabody (1920–1997), Governor of Massachusetts

Other
 USS Endicott (DD-495), a US Navy destroyer
 Endicott College, co-educational independent college located in Beverly, Massachusetts
 Endicott Performing Arts Center, community theatre in Endicott, New York
 "Endicott", a big band jazz song by Kid Creole and the Coconuts from the album In Praise of Older Women and Other Crimes
 Endicott Pear Tree, oldest living cultivated fruit tree in North America

See also
 Endicott Board, body convened in 1886 to address coastal defense needs of the US in light of rapid advances in naval ship design and weaponry
 Endicott Johnson Corporation, formerly the largest manufacturer of shoes in the US